CIF is an Indian police procedural television series currently aired on Dangal TV. The series stars Aditya Srivastava as Inspector Ashfaq Ali Khan and Dayanand Shetty as Inspector Hanuman Pandey. The location of the series is set in Lucknow, Uttar Pradesh, India.

Plot
A team of investigators examine criminal cases and strive to bring criminals to justice.

Episodes

*These "On air date" refers to release date on Dangal TV YouTube Channel.

Cast

Main
 Aditya Srivastava as Inspector Ashfaq Ali Khan
 Dayanand Shetty as Inspector Hanuman Pandey

Recurring
 Dinesh Phadnis as Constable Shambhu Tawde
 Ansha Sayed as Sub Inspector Meenakshi - Sharpshooter
 Abhay Shukla as Sub-Inspector Sushant Sharma
 Avdhesh Kumar as Sub-Inspector Ajay Singh
 Piyush Mehta as Hacker Zack/Jai Kishan
 Narendra Gupta as Dr. D'Souza - Senior Forensic Expert 
 Vineeta Malik as Hanuman Pandey's Mother
 Roop Durgapal as Dr. Sakshi Srivastav - Forensic Expert
 Kushal Punjabi as Shantibhushan Tiwary 
 Sharat Saxena as DCP Surya Pratap Singh 
 Meherzan Mazda 
 Deepak Wadhwa 
 Hiten Tejwani as Inspector Kesari Kumar - Special Officier 
 Kaushal Kapoor as DSP Alok Chauhan

References

External links

 Official Dangal TV website
 CIF on Dangal Play

Hindi-language television shows
Indian crime television series
2019 Indian television series debuts
Indian action television series
Police procedural television series
Fictional portrayals of police departments in India
Dangal TV original programming